Someone Else may refer to:
Someone Else (film), a 2006 British film
Someone Else (album), a 2004 album by Ira Losco
"Someone Else", a song by Miley Cyrus from the album Bangerz
"Someone Else" (song), a 2020 song by Duncan Laurence
"Someone Else", a song by Steve Angello from Wild Youth
"Someone Else", a song by The Rasmus from Into

See also
"Someone Else Not Me", a song by Duran Duran
Somebody Else, Not Me, a 1980 album by Dave Van Ronk